Aviva Stadium (also known as Lansdowne Road) is a sports stadium located in Dublin, Republic of Ireland, with a capacity for 51,711 spectators (all seated). It is built on the site of the former Lansdowne Road Stadium, which was demolished in 2007, and replaced it as home to its chief tenants: the Irish rugby union team and the Republic of Ireland football team. The decision to redevelop the stadium came after plans for both Stadium Ireland and Eircom Park fell through. Aviva Group Ireland signed a 10-year deal for the naming rights in 2009.

The stadium, located beside Lansdowne Road railway station, officially opened on 14 May 2010. The stadium is Ireland's first, and only, UEFA Category 4 Stadium and in 2011, it hosted the Europa League final. It also hosted the inaugural Nations Cup, as well as the regular home fixtures of the national rugby team, national football team and some home fixtures for Leinster Rugby from August 2010 onwards.

Unlike its predecessor, which was solely owned by the Irish Rugby Football Union (IRFU), the current stadium is controlled by the IRFU and the Football Association of Ireland (FAI) through a 50:50 joint venture known as the Lansdowne Road Stadium Development Company (LRSDC). The joint venture has a 60-year lease on the stadium; on expiry the stadium will return to the exclusive ownership of the IRFU.

History

The stadium was officially opened on 14 May 2010 by then Taoiseach (Irish prime minister) Brian Cowen. In 2011, the stadium won a British Construction Industry Award.

During the COVID-19 pandemic, the Irish Army (operating under Operation Fortitude) used the stadium for testing from 14 May onwards, following the handover from the Naval Service (which had been conducting tests under Operation Fortitude at Sir John Rogerson's Quay until that time).

Rugby union

Internationals 

The Ireland national rugby union team plays its home games at the stadium, as it did previously at Lansdowne Road, taking over from their temporary home, Croke Park, where games were played during Aviva's construction. Ireland's first international game was on 6 November 2010 against South Africa, with the Springboks winning 23–21. The game drew a crowd of 35,515, mainly due to a backlash by Ireland supporters over the IRFU's controversial ticketing strategy for the November Test series. Initially, the IRFU announced that tickets to the November Tests would only be sold as packages for all four matches. Later, it announced that the tickets would instead be split into two packages, with the South Africa Test bundled with the following week's match with Samoa for a minimum of €150, and the New Zealand and Argentina Tests bundled for a minimum of €190. single-game tickets were to be available only for the Samoa and Argentina Tests. On 1 November, the IRFU backed away from this plan amid heavy criticism from member clubs that had problems selling the packages in a difficult economy.

The first rugby union game at the Aviva was an exhibition game on 31 July 2010, billed as the O2 Challenge, involving under-18 and under-20 players from all four of Ireland's provincial sides, with a Leinster/Ulster side defeating a Munster/Connacht combination 68–0. As part of the run-up to the event, O2 ran a promotion which gave the winner the opportunity to attempt to score the ceremonial first points at the Aviva via a simulated conversion kick on the day before the match. The winner of the promotion, John Baker of Ennis, was successful. The first official points at the Aviva were scored by Ulster's Craig Gilroy with a try in the O2 Challenge.

Ireland won twelve consecutive matches at the Aviva between 2016 and 2018. They bested that record achieving their 13th consecutive home win in week two of the 2023 Six Nations. Ireland extended that record to 14 straight wins and achieved their 4th ever Grand Slam in 29–16 victory over England on 18 March 2023.

Updated 18 March 2023

Club competition
The stadium also hosts some home games for Leinster when the RDS Arena's smaller capacity does not satisfy demand. Leinster won their opening home game in the Aviva against Munster 13–9, in the Celtic League (now United Rugby Championship) season, in front of a then record league attendance of 50,645. This league record was exceeded on 29 March 2014 when Leinster again beat Munster, 22–18, in front of 51,700 people.

Leinster won their first Heineken Cup game in the stadium 24–8, against Clermont Auvergne in a pool game during the 2010–11 season. During Leinster's successful run to the Heineken Cup title that season, they took their quarter-final and semi-final matches to the stadium, defeating Leicester Tigers and Toulouse respectively. Ulster took their 2012 Heineken Cup semi-final to the stadium as well, defeating Edinburgh.

The 2013 Heineken Cup Final took place in the stadium on 18 May 2013 where Toulon beat Clermont Auvergne 16–15. The Heineken Cup final had last been held in Dublin in 2003 when Toulouse beat Perpignan 22–17 at Lansdowne Road.

Updated 21 January 2023

Association football

The stadium also hosts the home games of the Republic of Ireland national football team, as did Lansdowne Road. The team had played most home games at Croke Park during the construction of the Aviva Stadium. The first football match in the Aviva Stadium was Manchester United against a League of Ireland XI side, managed by Damien Richardson, on 4 August 2010. Manchester United won the game 7–1, with Park Ji-Sung scoring the first ever goal in the Aviva Stadium. The first international game for Ireland in the Aviva Stadium was a 1–0 friendly loss against Argentina on 11 August 2010. The first competitive goal was scored by Kevin Kilbane in a Euro 2012 qualifying game on 7 September 2010 against Andorra.

Updated as of 19 November 2022.

FAI Cup Final 

The Aviva has annually hosted the FAI Cup Final since 2010. While the Aviva Stadium was under construction the cup final hosting was shared between the RDS Arena and Tallaght Stadium. The first Cup Final at the new stadium was the 2010 FAI Cup Final, held on Sunday 14 November 2010. Sligo Rovers beat Shamrock Rovers 2–0 on penalties after the game finished 0–0 after extra time. A total of 36,101 attended the game making it the biggest attendance at an FAI Cup Final since 1968. A total of 37,126 spectators were in attendance for the 2021 final in which St. Patrick's defeated Bohemians F.C. on penalties.

2011 Nations Cup 
The 2011 Nations Cup took place in the Aviva Stadium. The tournament featured national football teams from Scotland, Wales, Northern Ireland and the Republic of Ireland. In the opening round of fixtures, the Republic of Ireland beat Wales 3–0 while Scotland beat Northern Ireland 3–0. The remaining four fixtures took place in May, with the Republic of Ireland winning the tournament after beating Scotland 1–0 on 29 May, with Keane scoring the only goal.

2011 Europa League Final 
The 2011 UEFA Europa League Final between Portuguese sides Porto and Braga took place in the Aviva Stadium. Due to UEFA rules against corporate sponsorship outside the federation, the stadium was referred to as the "Dublin Arena" for this final, that ended with a 1–0 victory for Porto.

Dublin Super Cup 
The Dublin Super Cup was a pre-season football tournament which was held at the Aviva. Celtic, Manchester City, Inter Milan and a League of Ireland XI competed in the 2011 edition, with Manchester City winning the tournament.

The 'Dublin Decider' 
The 'Dublin Decider' was a game which took place on 10 August 2013. The match was played between Celtic and Liverpool, with both teams having large support in Ireland. Celtic won the match 1-0 thanks to a goal from Amido Balde.	

There were talks ongoing about a return of the 'Dublin Decider' in the summer of 2014 with clubs such as Barcelona, Manchester United and Celtic being mentioned as potential visitors to the Aviva Stadium. It was confirmed in March 2016 that Celtic would face Barcelona in the stadium on 30 July 2016, however, this was as part of the annual International Champions Cup pre-season tournament, and not any sort of independent 'Dublin Decider' fixture. Barcelona won the game 3–1.

Abandoned UEFA Euro 2020 hosting 
On 19 September 2014, UEFA announced that the stadium would host four fixtures in the Euro 2020 finals tournament, three of which would be group games and, the fourth, a round of 16 matches. Had Ireland qualified they would have been guaranteed two home group games. As Aviva was not a commercial partner of the Euro 2020 tournament, the stadium would have been referred to as the Dublin Arena throughout. However, the COVID-19 pandemic intervened and UEFA postponed the tournament until 2021 (though UEFA retained the tournament's original name). Restrictions still in force after the pandemic's Third Wave struck the Republic of Ireland, killing thousands in the early part of 2021, meant that Dublin and the Aviva Stadium were unable to fulfil their hosting duties to UEFA's satisfaction and, therefore, the stadium lost its Euro 2020 host rights. The announcement, which came on 23 April 2021, allocated Dublin's three group games to the Krestovsky Stadium in Saint Petersburg, Russia, and Dublin's originally scheduled last 16 (group D winner vs group F runner up) tie to Wembley Stadium in London, England.

On 16 July 2021, the UEFA Executive Committee announced that due to the withdrawal of hosting rights for Euro 2020, the Aviva Stadium was given hosting rights for the 2024 UEFA Europa League Final. This was part of a settlement agreement by UEFA to recognise the efforts and financial investment made to host UEFA Euro 2020.

Other events

American football

On 1 September 2012, the stadium hosted an American college football game billed as the Emerald Isle Classic between the Notre Dame Fighting Irish and the Navy Midshipmen. Notre Dame won 50–10.

The 2016 Aer Lingus College Football Classic was announced as a matchup between the Georgia Tech Yellow Jackets and the Boston College Eagles to be played on 3 September 2016.  The result was a 17–14 win by the Yellow Jackets.

The Nebraska Cornhuskers and the Northwestern Wildcats kicked off their 2022 seasons at the Aviva Stadium with Northwestern winning 31–28. It was also confirmed that Notre Dame would once again play Navy in the Aer Lingus College Football Classic at the Aviva Stadium on 26 August 2023.

Concerts

Facilities
The stadium is a bowl shape with four tiers on three sides of the ground; the lower and upper tiers are for general access, the second and third levels feed the second tier for premium tickets and the fourth tier for corporate boxes. The northern end of the stadium, due to its proximity to local housing, incorporates only the lower tier of the bowl. This end of the stadium is to be the away stand for football internationals. There is one basement level and seven storeys of floors including ground level. The premium level holds 10,000 spectators, while the box level holds 1,300. The remaining 38,700 seats are shared between the top and bottom tiers. The capacity of the stadium was criticised even before its opening for being too small, particularly in light of the large supporter attendance figures for Irish rugby internationals and football internationals at Croke Park since 2007. The stadium's roof undulates in a wave-like manner so as to avoid blocking light to local residences.

In popular culture
The children's writer Gerard Siggins has based much of his 'Rugby Spirit' series in the Aviva Stadium. His hero, Eoin Madden, is on a school tour to the ground when he meets Brian Hanrahan, a true-life figure who was the only man ever to die playing sport in Lansdowne Road. Hanrahan, a Lansdowne FC rugby player, died when a scrum collapsed during a Leinster Senior Cup game against Trinity in 1928.

The seven books so far published in the series feature frequent visits to the stadium for matches.

Transport connections
The stadium is served by public transport with Bus and DART. More remotely, it may also be reached, following by the Luas and on foot. The stadium is inaccessible by car on match days due to a 1 km car-free exclusion zone in operation.

See also

 List of stadiums in Ireland

References

External links

 
 Lansdowne Road Stadium Development Company
 Aviva Stadium Buro Happold (engineers)
 Aviva arrives BBC Sport, 14 May 2010 (photo gallery)
 Dublin Arena open for business UEFA.com, 14 May 2010

Buildings and structures in Dublin (city)
Association football venues in the Republic of Ireland
Rugby union stadiums in Ireland
Ballsbridge
Ireland
Republic of Ireland national football team home stadiums
Ireland national rugby union team
Ringsend
Sports venues in Dublin (city)
Aviva
Association football venues in County Dublin
Sports venues completed in 2010
American football venues in the Republic of Ireland
Populous (company) buildings
2010 establishments in Ireland
21st-century architecture in the Republic of Ireland